The Poet Laureate of Washington is a poet designated by the government of the US state of Washington to promote poetry generally, and Washington poetry specifically, within the state. The office of Poet Laureate of Washington was established by an act of the Washington State Legislature in 2007.

History
In 1931, Ella Higginson was named "Poet Laureate of Washington" by the Washington State Federation of Women's Clubs, however, the position was an unofficial, privately recognized post. The office of Poet Laureate of Washington was not officially established until 2007 when the Washington legislature enacted a bill introduced by state senator Ken Jacobsen to create the office. Jacobsen's original proposal called for the poet laureate to be paid with a firkin of beer annually, however, the act as finally adopted simply specifies that the poet laureate "shall receive compensation at a level determined by the [Washington Arts] commission".

From 2009 to 2011 the office of poet laureate was vacant due to a paucity of state funds. In 2016 Gonzaga University professor Tod Marshall was appointed the fourth Poet Laureate of Washington. Marshall's major initiative during his term was Washington 129, an anthology of 129 poems gathered from Washingtonians meant to represent the 129 years (as of 2018) since Washington was admitted into the United States.

Office
The role of the Poet Laureate of Washington is to "build awareness and appreciation of poetry — including the state’s legacy of poetry — through public readings, workshops, lectures and presentations in communities, schools, colleges, universities, and other public settings in geographically diverse areas of the state". Poets Laureate of Washington are appointed for a two-year term by the Governor of Washington acting on the recommendation of the Washington Arts Commission, an independent agency of the Washington state government, from a list of self-nominated candidates. The incumbent is eligible for reappointment one time. The office's only statutory qualifications are that the candidate be a resident of Washington and a published poet, though the commission is empowered to establish additional criteria.

The Poet Laureate of Washington receives an annual stipend of $10,000, which is funded by the Washington State Arts Commission (ArtsWA) and Humanities WA.

Poets laureate of Washington
Samuel Green (2007—2009)
Kathleen Flenniken (2012—2014)
Elizabeth Austen (2014—2016)
Tod Marshall (2016—2018)
Claudia Castro Luna (2019—2021)
Rena Priest (2021—2023)

See also

 Poet laureate
 List of U.S. states' poets laureate
 United States Poet Laureate

References

Government of Washington (state)

2007 establishments in Washington (state)
American Poets Laureate